Greenwood Memorial United Methodist Church (also known as "Highland Memorial Episcopal Church" or "Greenwood Memorial Church") is an historic church at 378A-380 Washington Street in the Dorchester neighborhood of Boston, Massachusetts.

The church building was designed by Walter J. Paine, and built in 1900–01 in the shingle style for a congregation established in 1838.  The church was renamed in 1913 after a major bequest from parishioner Charles H. Greenwood in memory of his mother Sarah.

The church was listed on the National Register of Historic Places in 2002.

See also
National Register of Historic Places listings in southern Boston, Massachusetts

References

Churches completed in 1890
19th-century Methodist church buildings in the United States
Churches in Boston
Churches on the National Register of Historic Places in Massachusetts
United Methodist churches in Massachusetts
Shingle Style church buildings
Dorchester, Boston
National Register of Historic Places in Boston
Shingle Style architecture in Massachusetts